The Defense Media Activity (DMA) is a United States Department of Defense (DoD) field activity. It provides a broad range of high-quality multimedia products and services to inform, educate, and entertain Department of Defense audiences around the world. The Defense Media Activity is located on Fort Meade, Maryland. DoD field activities are established as DoD components by law, by the President, or by the Secretary of Defense to provide for the performance, on a DoD-wide basis, of a supply or service activity that is common to more than one Military Department when it is determined to be more effective, economical, or efficient to do so. DMA operates as a separate DoD Component under the authority, direction and control of the Assistant to the Secretary of Defense for Public Affairs.

History
The Defense Media Activity can trace its organizational lineage to the first publication of the Stars and Stripes newspaper produced by Union soldiers during the Civil War, in 1861. The DMA is one in a long line of media-related organizations established, consolidated or subsumed within the military departments and defense department. DMA was established as a result of the BRAC 2005 decisions.

Base Realignment and Closure 2005

In 2005, as part of the Base Realignment and Closure 2005 analysis, the Defense Department recommended consolidating the media-related organizations of the Military Departments into a single organization and co-locating it with the American Forces Information Service (an existing DoD field activity). The Defense Base Realignment and Closure (BRAC) Commission accepted the DoD recommendation and included the recommendation in its report to the President on September 8, 2005. On September 8, 2005, the President approved the BRAC Commission recommendations and forwarded them to the United States Congress. On September 20, 2005, the U.S. Congress failed to disapprove of the BRAC Commission's recommendations. Under the provisions of the Defense Base Realignment and Closure Act of 1990 (Public Law 101-510), the recommendations were effectively "approved".

The approved BRAC actions were to:
 Realign Fort Belvoir, Virginia, by relocating Soldiers Magazine to Fort Meade, Maryland.
 Realign Anacostia Annex, District of Columbia, by relocating the Naval Media Center to Fort Meade, Maryland.
 Realign 2320 Mill Road, a leased installation in Alexandria, Virginia, by relocating Army Broadcasting-Soldier Radio/TV to Fort Meade, Maryland.
 Realign 103 Norton Street, a leased installation in San Antonio, Texas by relocating Air Force News Agency and the Joint Hometown News Service to Fort Meade, Maryland.
 Close 601 North Fairfax Street, a leased installation in Alexandria, Virginia, by relocating the American Forces Information Service and the Army Broadcasting-Soldier Radio/TV to Fort Meade, Maryland.
 Consolidate Soldier Magazine, Naval Media Center, Army Broadcasting-Soldier Radio/TV, and the Air Force News Agency-Army/Air Force Hometown News Service into a single DoD Media Activity at Fort Meade, Maryland.

Establishment
In September 2007, the deputy defence secretary recognized that the BRAC 2005 decision would result in two field activities co-located at Fort Meade – the American Forces Information Service and DMA – and directed several actions.
 Consolidate American Forces Information Service with DMA.
 Include the internal media elements of the U.S. Marine Corps that were not addressed in the BRAC 2005 decision.
 Establish DMA on January 1, 2008.
 Transfer the funds and people from the legacy organizations to DMA on October 1, 2009.

DMA’s chartering directive, DoD Directive 5105.74, Defense Media Activity, was published on December 18, 2007.

DMA was formally established on January 1, 2008, and the people and funding from the predecessor organizations were transferred to DMA on October 1, 2008. The elements required to move to Fort Meade by the BRAC 2005 decision remained in their facilities as their facility at Fort Meade was designed and constructed. The building design was completed in September 2008.

On March 13, 2009, the U.S. Army Corps of Engineers, Baltimore District, awarded a $56,195,000 contract to Hensel Phelps Construction Co. of Chantilly, Virginia, to construct DMA’s headquarters and media production center Fort Meade, Maryland. It is a 185,870 square-foot facility built to house approximately 660 personnel. The building was completed in May 2011 and organizations began moving into the facility in June 2011. The move was completed in August 2011. DMA elements located in the Pentagon, Washington, D.C., Tobyhanna Army Depot, Riverside, California, and all overseas locations remained in place.

Organization and functions
Organization and Functions
DMA is composed of a headquarters and five Lines of Business (LoB).

The Defense Information School provides joint-service training to Defense military and civilian personnel in the career fields of Public Affairs and Visual Information. The school is located at Fort Meade, Maryland.

Media Production produces media and visual information products to the internal DoD family (active, guard, and reserve military service members, dependents, retirees, DoD civilians, and contract employees) and external audiences through all available media, including motion and still imagery; print; radio; television; web and related emerging internet, mobile, and other communication technologies. The American Forces Network (AFN), provides U.S. radio and television news, information, and entertainment programming to active, guard, and reserve military service members, DoD civilians and contract employees, and their families overseas, on board Navy and Coast Guard ships, and to other authorized users. It includes radio and television stations in military communities in Europe, the Pacific and the Middle East; and includes its central broadcasting hub, the AFN Broadcast Center at March Air Reserve Base in Riverside, California. Also includes communication of messages and themes from senior DoD leaders in order to support and improve quality of life and morale, promote situational awareness, provide timely and immediate force protection information, and sustain readiness. Other services of Media Production include Defense Visual Information Distribution Service and providing internal news and information products for Defense.gov, Army.mil, Navy.mil, Marines.mil, and AF.mil.

The Stars and Stripes produces and delivers a newspaper distributed overseas (and online products) for the U.S. military community. Editorially independent of interference from outside its own editorial chain of command, it provides commercially available U.S. and world news and objective staff-produced stories relevant to the military community.

Mission Support provides activity-wide administrative, facility management, transportation and logistics services.

Web Enterprise Business (WEB.mil) provides technology services to DMA, hosts hundreds of DoD websites through the DoD Public Web program, Defense Visual Information Distribution Service (DVIDS), and the Television-Audio Support Activity (T-ASA).

Leadership
DMA is led by a director appointed by the Assistant to the Secretary of Defense (Public Affairs) and may be a military flag or general officer, or a civilian appointed as a career member of the Senior Executive Service. The following is a list of DMA’s directors.

 January 28, 2021 to present, H.E. Pittman
 November 1, 2018, to January 28, 2021, (Acting Director) COL Paul R. Haverstick, Jr.
 February 1, 2018, to November 1, 2018, (Acting Director) COL Bernard Koelsch
 February 11, 2013, to February 1, 2018, Ray B. Shepherd
 May 1, 2012 – February 10, 2013, (Acting Director) Bryan G. Whitman, Principal Deputy Assistant Secretary of Defense for Public Affairs
 October 14, 2009 – April 30, 2012, (Acting Director), Melvin W. Russell, Director, American Forces Radio and Television Service, DMA
 March 29, 2009 – October 13, 2009, David S. Jackson<ref>U.S. Defense Department, "Biographies of Senior Defense Officials", retrieved 2013-10-5.</</ref>
 March 10, 2008 – March 28, 2009, (Acting Director) Robert T. Hastings, Jr., Principal Deputy Assistant Secretary of Defense for Public Affairs
 January 1, 2008 – March 9, 2008, (Acting Director) Bryan G. Whitman, Deputy Assistant Secretary of Defense for Media Operations

References

External links

 

United States Department of Defense agencies
Mass media in the United States
Mass media companies established in 2005
Event management companies
American companies established in 2005